Bettanagere is a 2015 Indian Kannada crime thriller film written and directed by Mohan Gowda Bettanagere. It is a fictional exposé of the underworld cousin goons Bethanagere Seena and Bethanagere Shankara who are based in the North Bangalore region called Bethanagere. The film is produced by B. N. Swamy and the music is composed by Rajesh Ramanath. The film stars Sumanth Shailendra and Akshay as the goon brothers along with former cricketer Vinod Kambli in a special supporting role.

Although the film went on floors in October 2013, it had to face many legal troubles and halts during the making. The filming had to be halted and it was reported that the film was dropped. The film eventually underwent a revival and resumed the shoot towards the completion in early 2015. However, the film had to settle for a record 139 edits from the censor board making it the first Kannada film with such large cuts.

Cast
 Akshay as Shekara
 Sumanth Shailendra as Shiva
 Naina Sarwar
 Vinod Kambli
  Muniraj
 Shobaraj
 Avinash
 Achyuth Kumar
 Bullet Prakash
 Yathiraj
 Killer Venkatesh
 Veena Sundar
 Ramnitu Chaudhary as item number "Bandi Bandi"

Soundtrack
The soundtrack is composed by Rajesh Ramanath. The audio was launched by director Ram Gopal Varma in Bangalore's Chamundeshwari Studios. Varma was in town for shooting his film Killing Veerappan. The lyrics of the song "Bandi Bandi" came under the scrutiny of the censor board and the entire lyrics had to be changed for the final approval.

Track listing

References

External links
Film on Rowdy Cousins Suffers 103 Cuts
 

2015 films
2015 crime thriller films
2010s Kannada-language films
Indian neo-noir films
Indian crime thriller films
Films scored by Rajesh Ramnath
Films about criminals
Films set in Bangalore
Films about organised crime in India
Crime films based on actual events
Thriller films based on actual events